Sagarin is a surname. Notable people with the surname include:

Edward Sagarin (1913–1986), American sociologist
Jeff Sagarin, American sports statistician